The WWA World Light Heavyweight Championship (Campeonato Mundial Semi Completo de WWA in Spanish) is a singles professional wrestling championship promoted by the Mexican Lucha Libre wrestling based promotion World Wrestling Association (WWA) since 1989. In the 1990s, the title was taken to Japan when reigning champion Gran Hamada returned to his home country. In Japan, the title became one of 8 championships that made up the New Japan Pro-Wrestling (NJPW) J-Crown Championship. When the J-Crown was broken up into individual titles the WWA World Light Heavyweight Championship returned to Mexico.

As it was a professional wrestling championship, the championship was not won not by actual competition, but by a scripted ending to a match determined by the bookers and match makers. On occasion the promotion declares a championship vacant, which means there is no champion at that point in time. This can either be due to a storyline, or real life issues such as a champion suffering an injury being unable to defend the championship, or leaving the company.

In 2005 Filoso, a wrestler from Pro Wrestling ZERO1, was billed as the WWA World Junior Light Heavyweight Champion, using the same title belt that had been used as part of the J-Crown and it had not been returned to the WWA. Even though Filoso never actually won the belt, he did defend the title, losing it in his first defense. The title is used by Zero1 but only shares the name of the World Junior Light Heavyweight Championship, not its lineage.

Title history

Official WWA championship

Pro Wrestling ZERO1 Version (Disputed Branch)

Footnotes

References

External links
WWA World Junior Light Heavyweight Title
WWA World Junior Light Heavyweight Title

Junior light heavyweight wrestling championships
Pro Wrestling Zero1 championships
Sports in Tijuana
World Wrestling Association (Mexico) Championships
World professional wrestling championships